Nangle is a surname. Notable people with the surname include:

David Nangle (born 1960), American politician
John Francis Nangle (1922–2008), American jurist
Richard Nangle (bishop), Irish bishop
Romello Nangle (born 1995), English football player
Thomas Nangle (1889–1972), Canadian cleric, Rhodesian politician
Edward Nangle (1799–1883), Missionary to Achill